Qualification for the 2004 UEFA European Championship took place between September 2002 and November 2003.

Fifty teams were divided into ten groups, with each team playing the others in their group twice, once at home and once away. The top team in each group automatically qualified for Euro 2004, and the ten group runners-up were paired off against each other to determine another five places in the finals.

Portugal qualified automatically as hosts of the event.

Qualified teams

{| class="wikitable sortable"
|-
! Team
! Qualified as
! Qualified on
! data-sort-type="number"|Previous appearances in tournament
|-
|  ||  ||  || 3 (1984, 1996, 2000)
|-
|  || Group 1 winner ||  || 5 (1960, 1984, 1992, 1996, 2000)
|-
|  || Group 3 winner ||  || 5 (1960, 1976, 1980, 1996, 2000)
|-
|  || Group 4 winner ||  || 2 (1992, 2000)
|-
|  || Group 8 winner ||  || 1 (1996)
|-
|  || Group 2 winner ||  || 6 (1964, 1984, 1988, 1992, 1996, 2000)
|-
|  || Group 5 winner ||  || 8 (1972, 1976, 1980, 1984, 1988, 1992, 1996, 2000)
|-
|  || Group 6 winner ||  || 1 (1980)
|-
|  || Group 7 winner ||  || 6 (1968, 1980, 1988, 1992, 1996, 2000)
|-
|  || Group 9 winner ||  || 5 (1968, 1980, 1988, 1996, 2000)
|-
|  || Group 10 winner ||  || 1 (1996)
|-
|  ||  ||  || 1 (1996)
|-
|  ||  ||  || 0 (debut)
|-
|  ||  ||  || 6 (1976, 1980, 1988, 1992, 1996, 2000)
|-
|  ||  ||  || 6 (1964, 1980, 1984, 1988, 1996, 2000)
|-
|  ||  ||  || 7 (1960, 1964, 1968, 1972, 1988, 1992, 1996)
|}

Tiebreakers
If two or more teams were equal on points on completion of the group matches, the following criteria were applied to determine the rankings:
 Higher number of points obtained in the group matches played among the teams in question.
 Superior goal difference from the group matches played among the teams in question.
 Higher number of goals scored in the group matches played among the teams in question.
 Higher number of goals scored away from home in the group matches played among the teams in question.
 If two or more teams still had an equal ranking, criteria 1) to 4) would be reapplied. If this procedure did not lead to a decision, criteria 6) and 7) would apply.
 Results of all group matches: 1. Superior goal difference 2. Higher number of goals scored 3. Higher number of goals scored away from home 4. Fair play conduct.
 Drawing of lots.

Seedings
The draw occurred on 25 January 2002 in Santa Maria da Feira, Portugal. 50 teams were divided into five drawing pots based on the latest 2001-edition of the UEFA National Team Coefficient ranking, that had calculated an average of the team's points per game achieved combined in the Euro 2000 qualifiers and 2002 World Cup qualifiers. The seeding list was however subject to some few minor modifications:
 France (ranked 11) were seeded first as the defending champions (title holders). Consequently, all teams ranked above them from 1 to 10 moved down one seeding place lower than their rankings.
 Portugal (ranked 4) was not seeded, as they did not participate in the qualifying tournament due to already having qualified automatically for the final tournament as hosts. Consequently, all teams ranked below them moved up one seeding place higher than their ranking position.

Ten groups were formed by drawing one team from each of the five pots.

Teams in bold eventually qualified for the final tournament, teams in bold italic qualified for the final tournament through the play-offs, and teams in italic participated in the play-offs but did not qualify for the final tournament.

Note: The UEFA National Team Coefficient ranking automatically had taken into account in its ranking calculation, that some teams only played one of the two preceding qualification tournaments. Since Belgium and Netherlands qualified automatically for UEFA Euro 2000 as co-hosts, the coefficient factored only their 2002 FIFA World Cup qualifying record. France had also qualified automatically for the 2002 FIFA World Cup as 1998 FIFA World Cup Champions, meaning the coefficient used only the UEFA Euro 2000 qualification record for France.

Summary

Groups

Group 1

Group 2

Group 3

Group 4

Group 5

Group 6

Group 7

Group 8

Group 9

Group 10

Play-offs

Goalscorers

Notes

References

External links
 UEFA Euro 2004 at UEFA.com

 
2004
2002–03 in European football
UEFA Euro 2004